Cameron Road is a street in Tsim Sha Tsui, Kowloon, Hong Kong.

Location
The west end of Cameron Road is Nathan Road while the east end is Chatham Road South, and it is almost parallel to Granville Road and Mody Road.

Name
Cameron Road is named after Major General William Gordon Cameron, the Administrator of Hong Kong from April to October 1887.

Shopping
The area east of Nathan Road, comprising Cameron Road, Granville Road and Carnarvon Road has been described as having "teeming shops" and likely the main reason that Hong Kong acquired the "shopping paradise" tag, a phrase first put into print in an ironic manner by author Han Suyin, in her 1952 novel A Many-Splendoured Thing.

In popular culture
The 2003 Johnnie To movie PTU is partly set in Cameron Road. While the final shootout sequence of the film takes place in Canton Road, To reportedly said that "if there was a single location where he would have wanted to stage a gunfight battle, it was Cameron Road, but he could not get permission from the police to do it". The sequence was actually shot in Ap Lei Chau.

See also
List of streets and roads in Hong Kong

References

External links

Google Maps of Cameron Road

Roads in Kowloon
Tsim Sha Tsui